Elvas may refer to :

 Elvas, Portugal, a municipality in Portugal.
 the former Diocese of Elvas, a historical bishopric (1571-1882), now a Latin titular see.
 Castle of Elvas (known as Castelo de Elvas in Portuguese), a Portuguese castle.
 Rádio Elvas, Alto Alentejo's Local radiostation, Portugal.
 Elvas River, a river of Minas Gerais state in southeastern Brazil.
 O Elvas C.A.D., a football club based in Portalegre, Alentejo.
 Cancioneiro de Elvas (in English: Elvas Songbook), one of the four Renaissance songbooks of Portuguese music from the 16th century
 Battle of the Lines of Elvas, was fought on 14 January 1659, in Elvas, between Portugal and Spain.
 Treaty of Elvas
 Elvas Freeway

See also 
 Elva (disambiguation)